Poetry School is a national arts organisation, registered charity and adult education centre providing creative writing tuition, with teaching centres throughout England as well as online courses and downloadable activities. It was founded in 1997 by poets Mimi Khalvati, Jane Duran and Pascale Petit. Poetry School offers an accredited Master's degree in Writing Poetry, delivered in both London and Newcastle, in collaboration with Newcastle University. Online courses are delivered via CAMPUS, a social network dedicated to poetry.

In 2018 the Poetry School moved to new premises at Dock Offices, Canada Water, London, from their previous offices on Lambeth Walk.

The Poetry School's annual Books of the Year list is released in December, and celebrates noteworthy books and pamphlets of poetry published during the year.

Poetry School works with a number of partner organisations to deliver a range of projects, including the Ginkgo Prize for Ecopoetry, the Primers mentorship scheme, and, from 2018, a new poetry award and mentorship programme, The Women Poets' Prize, in memory of The Literary Consultancy co-founder Rebecca Swift. The Women Poets' Prize offers three female-identifying poets a programme of support and creative professional development opportunities in collaboration with seven partner organisations, including, in addition to Poetry School, Faber and Faber, Bath Spa University, The Literary Consultancy, RADA, City Lit and Verve Festival.

Ginkgo Prize for Ecopoetry 
Poetry School runs the Ginkgo Prize for Ecopoetry (formerly the Resurgence Prize), a major international award for poems embracing ecological themes, with a first prize of £5,000.

The Resurgence Prize was founded in 2014 by poet Andrew Motion and actress and activist Joanna Lumley. The Ginkgo Prize was established in 2018 with funding from the Edward Goldsmith Foundation to commemorate the poet Teddy Goldsmith on the 25th anniversary of the publication of his book The Way.

Winners of the Ginkgo Prize
2018
1st: Jemma Borg, "Unripe"
2nd: Teresa Dzieglewicz, "If you’re married, why do you call her Teresa?"
3rd: Linda France, "In the Physic Garden"

Winners of the Resurgence Prize
 2017 – Seán Hewitt, "Ilex"
 2016 – Rob Miles, "Captivity"
 2015 – Luisa Igloria, "Auguries"

Laurel Prize
In November 2019 poet laureate Simon Armitage announced that he would donate his salary as poet laureate to create a new prize for a collection of poems "with nature and the environment at their heart". The prize is to be run by the Poetry School. The first award was to be announced on 23 May 2020 at the Yorkshire Sculpture Park, the judges being Armitage, Robert Macfarlane, and Moniza Alvi. Armitage has said that the prize should "be part of the discourse and awareness about our current environmental predicament".

Laurel Prize winners 2021 

 1st: Seán Hewitt, Tongues of Fire (Jonathan Cape)
 2nd: Ash Davida Jane, How to Live with Mammals (Victoria University Press)
 3rd: Sean Borodale, Inmates (Jonathan Cape)
 Best First Collection: Will Burns, Country Music (Offord Road Books)

Laurel Prize winners 2020
The shortlisted poems were discussed on BBC Radio 3's The Verb in September 2020, and the winners were announced on National Poetry Day.
1st: Pascale Petit, Mama Amazonica (Bloodaxe)
2nd: Karen McCarthy Woolf, Seasonal Disturbances (Carcanet)
3rd: Colin Simms, Hen Harrier (Shearsman)
Best First Collection: Matt Howard, Gall (Rialto)

Primers 
Primers is an annual mentoring and publication scheme organised by Poetry School and Nine Arches Press. It provides a unique opportunity for talented poets to find publication and receive a programme of supportive feedback, mentoring and promotion.

Previous winners 

 2018 – Lewis Buxton, Victoria Richards, Amelia Louli
 2017 – Romalyn Ante, Aviva Dautch, Sarala Estruch
 2016 – Cynthia Miller, Ben Bransfield, Marvin Thompson
 2015 – Geraldine Clarkson, Lucy Ingrams, Katie Griffiths, Maureen Cullen

References

External links 

 Poetry School website
 Ginkgo Prize for Ecopoetry website
 MA in Writing Poetry, Newcastle University

Poetry organizations
British writers' organisations
British poetry